The 1910 Lancashire Cup was the sixth year of the regional rugby league competition and once again a previous winner captured the trophy. The cup was won by Oldham who beat Swinton in the final at Wheater's Field, Broughton, Salford, by a score of 4–3. The attendance at the final was 14,000 and receipts £418.

Background 
For the fourth year in succession the same 12 clubs entered and four clubs awarded byes in the first round.

Competition and results

Round 1  
Involved  4 matches (with four byes) and 12 clubs

Round 2 – quarterfinals

Round 3 – semifinals

Final

Teams and scorers 

Scoring - Try = three (3) points - Goal = two (2) points - Drop goal = two (2) points

The road to success

Notes and comments 
1 Wheater's Field was the home ground of Broughton Rangers with a capacity of 20,000

See also 
1910–11 Northern Rugby Football Union season

References

RFL Lancashire Cup
Lancashire Cup